The Helpmann Award for Best Musical is a musical theatre award, presented by Live Performance Australia (LPA) at the annual Helpmann Awards since 2001. The award is for a production in Australia, and is open to both new musicals and revivals. This is a list of winners and nominations for the Helpmann Award for Best Musical.

Winners and nominees

Source:

2000s

2010s

See also
Helpmann Awards

References

External links
The official Helpmann Awards website

M
Musical theatre awards